Altyn Asyr is a city in Tejen District, Ahal Province, Turkmenistan. Its main economic activity is cotton farming.

Etymology
The words altyn asyr mean  "golden age" in Turkmen. The phrase is used to describe the post-Soviet era of Turkmen independence, particularly during the reign of President Saparmurat Niyazov.

History
The municipality was founded on the basis of the Soviet-era cotton-producing "Tejen" state farm. Following independence, state and collective farms were redesignated villages and towns. The Tejen State Farm was designated a town and initially named Bereket ("fertile").  In 2000 it was renamed Altyn Asyr ("Golden Age") and made the administrative center of a new district of the same name formed from parts of Sarahs District, Tejen District, and Kaka District.  On 28 April 2016 Altyn Asyr was further upgraded, to city-in-a-district status, by parliamentary decree. The Altyn Asyr District was abolished by act of Parliament on 5 January 2018 and its territory was transferred to  Tejen, Kaka, and Sarahs Districts. The city of Altyn Asyr was reassigned to Tejen District.

People associated with Altyn Asyr
A director of the former state farm, Chary Hanamov, wrote a memoir of his life and times. Hanamov was recognized as a Hero of Socialist Labor in 1976. Hanamov's son, Nurmuhammet Hanamow, served as independent Turkmenistan's ambassador to Turkey and subsequently went into exile as an opposition leader.

Transportation
Altyn Asyr is located between Turkmenistan's main east–west motor route, the M37 highway, and the P-7 highway that links Tejen and Sarahs.

Appearance in motion picture
In 1969 the "Tejen" state farm was the subject of cinematography.

References

Populated places in Ahal Region